Cyperus stewartii is a species of flowering plant in the family Cyperaceae, native to Cocos Island in the Pacific Ocean off the coast of the Central American country of Costa Rica. It was first described by Gordon C. Tucker in 2014.

References

stewartii
Flora of the Central American Pacific Islands
Plants described in 2014